Xanthoparmelia bainskloofensis is a species of saxicolous (rock-dwelling), foliose lichen in the family Parmeliaceae. It was formally described as a new species in 2002 by lichenologists John Elix and Thomas Hawkes Nash III. The species epithet refers to the type locality, the only place the lichen is known to occur. It contains usnic acid as a major lichen product, and minor amounts of echinocarpic acid, conechinocarpic acid, and hypothamnolic acid.

See also
List of Xanthoparmelia species

References

bainskloofensis
Lichen species
Lichens described in 2002
Lichens of South Africa
Taxa named by John Alan Elix
Taxa named by Thomas Hawkes Nash III